The 1915–16 season was the twenty-third season in which Dundee competed at a Scottish national level, playing in Division One, where they would finish in 8th place. Due to the ongoing First World War, the Scottish Cup was cancelled for the 1915–16 season.

Scottish Division One 

Statistics provided by Dee Archive.

League table

Player Statistics 
Statistics provided by Dee Archive

|}

See also 

 List of Dundee F.C. seasons

References 

 

Dundee F.C. seasons
Dundee